Albert Julian Salvadori (born May 6, 1945) is an American former professional basketball player. He was selected in the 1967 NBA draft but instead played in the American Basketball Association. Salvadori played for the Oakland Oaks during the 1967–68 ABA season and scored 54 points. He is also the father of Kevin Salvadori, who had a brief stint in the NBA in the mid-1990s.

References

1945 births
Living people
American men's basketball players
Baltimore Bullets (1963–1973) draft picks
Basketball players from West Virginia
Forwards (basketball)
Oakland Oaks players
South Carolina Gamecocks men's basketball players
Sportspeople from Wheeling, West Virginia